is a former Japanese football player. She played for Japan national team.

Club career
Nakade was born in Mie Prefecture on December 6, 1988. After graduating from Kibi International University, she played for Iga FC Kunoichi.

National team career
In November 2008, Nakade was selected Japan U-20 national team for 2008 U-20 World Cup. On September 26, 2013, she debuted for Japan national team against Nigeria.

National team statistics

References

External links

1988 births
Living people
Kibi International University alumni
Association football people from Mie Prefecture
Japanese women's footballers
Japan women's international footballers
Nadeshiko League players
Iga FC Kunoichi players
Women's association football forwards
Universiade silver medalists for Japan
Universiade medalists in football
Medalists at the 2009 Summer Universiade
Medalists at the 2011 Summer Universiade